Dishu may refer to:

Dishu, Afghanistan, village in Dishu District, Helmand Province, Afghanistan
Dishu District, district in Helmand Province, Afghanistan
Dishu system, legal and moral system involving marriage and inheritance in ancient East Asia
Ground calligraphy (地書, dishu), a recreational practice of calligraphy, involving writing with a large water brush on the ground, in Chinese culture